The first cabinet of Rafic Hariri was the 61st government and one of the post-civil war governments of Lebanon. It was inaugurated on 31 October 1992 replacing the cabinet led by Rachid Solh. 

Hariri's first cabinet lasted until 25 May 1995 and was succeeded by his second cabinet which would exist only until November 1996. The head of the state was president Elias Hrawi during the term of Hariri's first cabinet.

Ministries and support
A number of new ministries was introduced through the establishment of the cabinet, including the state ministries for displaced, municipal affairs and ministry of public works. These institutions later had legal basis when the related laws were approved by the parliament. 

Hariri's first cabinet was supported by nearly all Lebanese political parties which voted in favor of it at the parliament. The only political group which voted against the cabinet was Hezbollah.

Cabinet members
Although the cabinet included some significant political figures, some of its members were technocrats and experts. Six cabinet members were part of the previous cabinet: Michel Murr, Marwan Hamadeh, Abdallah Al Amin, Fares Boueiz, Mohsen Dalloul and Michel Samaha. Nearly ten of newcomers were close allies of Prime Minister Rafic Hariri who also held the post of finance minister. Hariri's legal advisor and lawyer, Bahij Tabbara, was named as the justice minister. Three cabinet members were former militia leaders: Walid Jumblat, Elie Hobeika and Suleiman Franjieh, all of who were appointed minister of state.

In the cabinet there were two Armenian politicians: Shahé Barsoumian from the Tashnag Party and Hagop Demirdjian who was a member of the Armenian General Benevolent Union. The latter was also among the close confidants of Rafic Hariri. Georges Frem was the only cabinet member who was close to Nasrallah Boutros Sfeir, patriarch of the Maronite Church in Lebanon.

List of ministers
The cabinet was made up of the following members:

Resignations and removals
In June 1993 Minister of Electricity and Water Resources Georges Frem was removed from the post which caused the harsh criticisms by Maronite patriarch Nasrallah Boutros Sfeir against Rafic Hariri.

References

External links

1992 establishments in Lebanon
1995 disestablishments in Lebanon
Cabinets of Lebanon
Cabinets established in 1992
Cabinets disestablished in 1995